The men's 100 metres sprint competition of the athletics events at the 1979 Pan American Games took place on 7 and 8 July at the Estadio Sixto Escobar. The defending Pan American Games champion was Silvio Leonard of Cuba.

Records
Prior to this competition, the existing world and Pan American Games records were as follows:

Results
All times shown are in seconds. Harvey Glance set a new Pan American Record in the semifinals with a time of 10.12 seconds.

Heats
Held on 7 July

Wind:Heat 1: +0.7 m/s, Heat 2: +0.8 m/s, Heat 3: +1.1 m/s, Heat 4: +0.4 m/s

Semifinals
Held on 7 July

Wind:Heat 1: +0.9 m/s, Heat 2: +1.0 m/s

Final
Held on 8 July

Wind: +1.5 m/s

References

Athletics at the 1979 Pan American Games
1979